Balarambati railway station is a railway station on the Howrah–Bardhaman chord and is located in Hooghly district in the Indian state of West Bengal.

References 

Railway stations in Hooghly district
Howrah railway division
Kolkata Suburban Railway stations
Railway stations opened in 1917